Dr Yechiel (Michael) Leiter is an Israeli historian of philosophy, and also a public policy analyst.

Leiter is a resident scholar at Jerusalem's Herzl Institute. He has previously served as Chief of Staff to Benjamin Netanyahu at Israel's Ministry of Finance and as political assistant to Ariel Sharon in Israel's parliament. Leiter is also an ordained Rabbi and has written three books and numerous essays on politics in the Middle East.

Early life and education

Yechiel Leiter was born on 1 October 1959 in Scranton, Pennsylvania. After moving to Israel in 1978 at the age of 18, Leiter served as a combat medic in the IDF and participated in Operation Peace for The Galilee in 1982. He studied Judaism over the course of eight years and subsequently taught Judaism at a number of centers for higher learning in Jerusalem. Leiter holds an undergraduate degree in Law, a BA in Political Science, an MA in International Relations, and a PhD in political philosophy from the University of Haifa. His doctoral thesis focuses on the influence of the Hebrew Bible on John Locke's theory of consensual government.

Career
Leiter served as a political advisor to Knesset Member Ariel Sharon, and in multiple senior government positions: first as Deputy Director General of Israel's Ministry of Education where he helped plan a major overhaul of the educational system, and then as Chief of Staff to Benjamin Netanyahu in the Ministry of Finance, where he took an active role in the dramatic economic reform program that revolutionized Israel's economy.

Leiter subsequently became a senior policy analyst at the Jerusalem Center for Public Affairs, one of Israel's leading foreign policy institutes where he directed and edited one of Israel's leading geo-political blogs: JCPA.org. In that capacity he was also a frequent guest on Israeli news programs, and was a contributor to major Israeli media outlets such as YNet, Maariv-NRG, and columnist for Israel's leading daily, Yisrael Hayom. In 2008, Leiter ran as a candidate for election to the Knesset in the Likud Party's primaries.

He has served as the Chief Executive Officer of 3H Global, a leading international consultancy working alongside global leaders and many of the world's most influential figures. 3H Global specializes in helping governments to formulate policy unique to the needs of each country and assists with hands-on implementation of those policies. In his capacity as CEO of 3H Global, Leiter co-authored the 100-Day Plan for the new government of Paraguay and was the key architect of the government's economic development plan.

In 2011, he was elected Chairman of Israel Ports Authority in a unanimous vote by the company's board of directors. In that capacity he was responsible for the planning of Israel's seaport operations and the building of two new deep-water ports in Ashdod and Haifa.

Leiter taught political philosophy at the Law Faculty at Israel's Kiryat Ono Academic Center. He is Strategic Advisor to the Foundation to the Archaeological Exploration, Restoration and Expansion of Ancient Shiloh.

Leiter has served as a member of the Board of Governors of the University of Judea and Samaria in Ariel, and as a director on the National Committee for the Perpetuation of the Memory of Theodor Herzl. He also serves on the Board of Directors of "The Israel Experience" a daughter company of the Jewish Agency for Israel, which manages the "Taglit-Birthright" program in Israel.

eiter has authored three books and dozens of articles on Zionism and Israeli politics, and has lectured extensively to diverse audiences throughout the United States, Canada, England, Australia, South Africa, and South America. He lives in the Samarian community of Eli with his wife and their eight children.

Bibliography

John Locke's Political Philosophy and the Hebrew Bible,  2018, Cambridge University Press.
  Aloh Naaleh - The Aliyah Imperative (1988) Hebrew
 A Peace to Resist: Why the Rabin-Arafat Deal Must Be Stopped, and How It Can Be Done (1993)
 Crisis in Israel (1994)
 Israel at the cross-roads: The view from the hills of Judea and Samaria (1999)
 Between Despair and Hope: Public Perceptions of Educational Reform (2005)
 Political Views from Above (2008) Hebrew
 The Political Hebraism of John Locke: A New-Old REading of the Two Treatises of Government (2008)

References

Israeli civil servants
Israeli political scientists
Living people
Rabbis in Hebron
University of Haifa alumni
Israeli rabbis
American emigrants to Israel
Year of birth missing (living people)
Academic staff of Ono Academic College